Wrong Turn 5: Bloodlines (also known as Wrong Turn 5) is a 2012 American slasher film written and directed by Declan O'Brien. The film stars Camilla Arfwedson, Roxanne McKee and Doug Bradley. It is the fifth installment in the Wrong Turn film series, and is both a sequel to Wrong Turn 4: Bloody Beginnings (2011), and a prequel to Wrong Turn (2003).

The film was followed by Wrong Turn 6: Last Resort (2014).

Plot
In the city of Fairlake, Greenbrier County in West Virginia, the Hillickers—Three Finger, Saw Tooth, and One Eye start a murdering rampage with the help of the serial killer as well as their grandfather Maynard Odets where they first murder news reporter, Kaleen Webber.

Meanwhile, five friends, Billy, his girlfriend Cruz, Lita, her boyfriend Gus, and Julian, are going to Fairlake to celebrate the Mountain Man Music Festival for Halloween. Along the way, they almost run over Maynard, who attacks them. Billy, Gus, and Julian attack him out of self-defense but are all apprehended along with Lita and Cruz by town sheriff Angela Carter and her deputy partner Kevin Biggs. While Carter leaves to take them to the police station, the cannibals appear and kill Biggs. Locked up in the police station, Billy convinces Carter to release his friends as he owns his drugs, and they left as he remained in his cell.

The cannibals use their truck to pull down a phone pole, taking out the service to the town. They then proceed to the power plant, killing a guard and shutting down the town's electricity. While most of the townspeople attend the festival, the teens register at a motel to stay while waiting for their friend to be released by his family's lawyer. Three Finger chases Cruz and kills her on her way to visit Billy. After Julian leaves the motel back to the police station, Gus is abducted by the cannibals while One Eye attempts to capture Lita, but she manages to escape.

Carter sees the cannibals drop Gus, who had his legs crippled. She attempts to save him, but the cannibals run him over with their pick-up truck, killing him. Carter frees Billy and gives him, Julian, and prisoner Mose shotguns to guard the station. She sneaks into an appliance store to communicate with radio jockey Teddy asking him to call for backup, but he rudely dismisses her message as a joke. After Lita reaches the police station, Billy and Julian leave to search for Cruz despite Carter's objections. They wander the streets and find Cruz's dead body; while trying to get the body back to the station, they encounter the cannibals, who capture them and place them on a football pitch, where Three Finger kills both with a snowblower. Carter then sends Mose to search for the deputies, but he unknowingly runs over a barbed wire in the road and crashes. He awakens to find himself captured by the cannibals, who burn him alive. After hearing Mose's screams over the radio, Carter exits the station as Lita unwittingly releases Maynard, who stabs her eyes out. Carter finds her husband Jason bound in a car and tries to help him, but a sickle tied to the door guts his body as Three Finger fights the sheriff before overpowering and capturing her.

Carter awakens in the jail cell with her hands tied to the ceiling. Maynard gives her the option of dying by fire or from a shotgun with the trigger near her feet. Carter eventually triggers the shotgun, killing herself as the cell burns down. Lita, unable to see, is captured by Maynard and his cannibal grandsons before being driven away into the woods, screaming.

Cast

Doug Bradley as Maynard Odets
Camilla Arfwedson as Sheriff Angela Carter
Roxanne McKee as Lita
Simon Ginty as Billy Brodin
Paul Luebke as Gus
Oliver Hoare as Julian
Amy Lennox as Cruz
Kyle Redmond Jones as Deputy Kevin Biggs
Duncan Wisbey as Mose
Borislav Iliev as Three Finger
George Karlukovski as Saw Tooth
Radoslav Parvanov as One Eye
Peter Brooke as Jason Carter
Finn Jones as Teddy Tabet
Emilia Klayn as Kaleen Webber
Andrew Bone as George
Rosie Holden as Virginia 'Ginny' Kelly
Harry Anichkin as Doctor Rick
Velizar Peev as Night Watchman
Borisa Tutundjieva as Linda
Nikola Dzupanov as Police Officer

Release
The film was released on DVD and Blu-ray on October 23, 2012. The Blu-ray edition is a two-disc set which includes a Blu-ray disc of the feature film, as well as a DVD/Digital Copy disc.

References

External links

Incest in film
American splatter films
American slasher films
5
2010s slasher films
2012 films
2012 horror films
Halloween horror films
20th Century Fox direct-to-video films
Constantin Film films
Summit Entertainment films
Films about cannibalism
Films set in 2003
Films set in West Virginia
Films shot in Bulgaria
Direct-to-video horror films
Direct-to-video prequel films
Direct-to-video sequel films
Direct-to-video interquel films
2012 direct-to-video films
2010s English-language films
2010s American films
American prequel films